Shlomo Lahiani (born May 22, 1965) is a business owner and former Israeli politician. He was formerly mayor of Bat Yam. 
In 2014, following an investigation, Lahiani pleaded guilty to three counts of breach of public trust.

Biography
Shlomo Lahiani was born in Israel. His father was an immigrant from Bengazi, Libya.

Political career
In 1997, he founded the independent political movement Bat Yam BeRosh Muram ("Bat Yam with its head held high"). In 1998, the movement won five seats on the Bat Yam city council. He served as a city council member and leader of the opposition from 1998 until 2003, when he became mayor.
he was first elected mayor as a Labour-backed independent in 2003 with 45% of the vote, beating the Likud candidate. He was subsequently re-elected, with 86.3% of the vote, reportedly the highest ever in a large Israeli city, in 2008.

Public activism
In 2000, he founded Ohavim, a non-profit organization with the goal of improving welfare and child care, and managing soup kitchens in the city.

Controversy
In December 2009, Lahiani was arrested on charges of fraud, breach of trust, embezzlement and  following a two-year undercover investigation. Lahiani was indicted in April 2013 with breach of trust.

In a plea bargain reached in 2014, Lahiani pleaded guilty to three reduced charges of breach of trust. On September 30, 2014, he was given six months of community service, as well as a six-month suspended sentence and a 250,000-shekel (US$67,840) fine, and barred from politics for seven years. He admitted to using money from the bribes to pay debts of his construction company, Alshav.

References

1965 births
Living people
Israeli government officials convicted of crimes
Israeli people convicted of bribery
Israeli people of Libyan-Jewish descent
Israeli politicians convicted of corruption
Jewish Israeli politicians
Kadima politicians
Mayors of places in Israel
People from Bat Yam
Israeli politicians convicted of crimes